Quarry Hill is the name of several places in the world:

Quarry Hill, Leeds, England
Quarry Hill (Hong Kong)
Quarry Hill, Victoria, in Bendigo, Australia
Quarry Hill (Greene County, New York), US
Quarry Hill (Riverside, California), in Riverside, California, US
Quarry Hill Creative Center, Rochester, Vermont, US
Quarry Hill Nature Center, Rochester, Minnesota, US